

People with the surname Trask
Alan Trask, American farmer and politician
Betty Trask, English romantic novelist
Clara Augusta Jones Trask (1839-1905), American writer
Diana Trask, a singer
Elbridge Trask, a mountain man
Eliphalet Trask, a politician
Gustavus Trask, the governor of Sailors' Snug Harbor
Haunani-Kay Trask, an activist and writer
John Trask (disambiguation)
Katrina Trask, an author and philanthropist
Keith Trask, a rower
Kyle Trask (born 1998), an American football player
Larry Trask, a linguist
Leonard Trask, famous 1860s medical curiosity
Mililani Trask, an activist
Orville Trask, an American football player
Ozell Miller Trask, U.S. federal judge
Sigourney Trask, an American physician and missionary
Spencer Trask, a financier and philanthropist
Stephen Trask (Stephen Rhodes Schwartz), a musician and composer
Wayland Trask, Jr., American silent film actor

In fiction

 Oliver Trask, a character on The O.C.
 Father Trask, a minor character that appears in "The Wedding from Hell", an episode of Charmed who is a part of a secret organization to stop Hecate.
 Trask Ulgo, a character in the video game Star Wars: Knights of the Old Republic
 Reverend Trask, a character in the 1960s soap opera Dark Shadows.
 The Trask family, characters in John Steinbeck's 1952 novel East of Eden
 Trask Industries, a company owned by the Trask family in Working Girl
 Trask security, a company handling kidnapping and ransom cases in Studio 60 on the Sunset Strip
 Jason Trask, a rogue government agent in episodes of Lois and Clark: The New Adventures of Superman
 Frank Trask, a guide in Jasper National Park in the novel Icefields by Thomas Wharton

Marvel Comics
Characters appearing with the last name in stories of the X-Men:
 Bolivar Trask, military scientist and creator of the Sentinels 
 Simon Trask, brother of Bolivar Trask and founder of Humanity's Last Stand 
 Larry Trask, mutant son of Bolivar Trask
 Marshal Bartholomew "Bat" Trask, "malform" hunter in the DC/Marvel Amalgam Comics Generation Hex

See also
 Trask Coliseum
 Trask Mountain
 Trask River
 Trask Scout Reservation
 TRASK (computer)